The Stearman M-2 Speedmail (nicknamed the Bull Stearman) was a mail-carrier aircraft produced by the Stearman Aircraft Company of Wichita, Kansas. It first flew in January 1929. The Speedmail was a single-seat biplane, with two large cargo compartments in place of a front cockpit. The fuselage and tail unit were constructed from welded chrome-moly steel tube faired with wooden formers and fabric covered aft of the pilot's cockpit, and detachable aluminium alloy panels covered the fuselage forward of the cockpit. The wings were constructed from spruce spars and plywood built-up ribs, all fabric covered. It differed from previous Stearman aircraft by having a tailwheel instead of a tailskid due to its size and weight.

Design and development

Lloyd Stearman and Mac Short, (Stearman's V.P. engineering), designed the Speedmail to the requirements of Varney Air Lines, which needed a new mail carrier with greater capacity to fly the Air Mail contracts they acquired from the U.S. Postal service while still being able to land on short, unimproved airstrips. This was achieved by using a new type of airfoil section allowing high lift at low speeds without affect the cruising speed. The result was a sturdy aircraft with a large cargo capacity. 

To enable Interstate Air Lines to fly passengers on its Air Mail routes from Atlanta, Stearman enlarged the M-2, into the LT-1(Light Transport), adding a four-seat enclosed cabin in place of the forward cargo compartments, the payload capacity allowed for four passenger plus luggage and 500 pounds of cargo or mail.

A further development was the CAB-1 "Coach" which was designed with an enclosed cabin for use as a business aircraft. Unlike the LT-1, the pilot was inside the enclosed cabin and in front of the passengers. However, only one was built which was later dismantled when sales failed to materialize.

Stearman then developed a scaled down version of the M-2, the Stearman 4 which was successful.

Operational history
Varney Air Lines' pilots found the M-2 difficult to handle and the Wright Cyclone engine was plagued with frequent maintenance issues. The sole surviving Stearman M-2 Speedmail is on display in the collection of the Western Antique Aeroplane & Automobile Museum in Hood River, Oregon, U.S.A.

Variants

M-2 Speedmail Single-engine mail transport aircraft, powered by a 525 hp (391-kW) Wright Cyclone radial engine, able to carry up to 1,000 lb (454 kg) of mail.
Stearman LT-1 Slightly larger 5-seat passenger and mail carrier, powered by a Pratt & Whitney Hornet radial piston engine.
CAB-1 Coach Similar to the M-2 with enclosed cockpit filling gap between the fuselage and wing and powered with a 300 hp Wright J-6-7.

Operators

Varney Air Lines

Specifications (M-2 Speedmail)

See also

References

Citations

Bibliography
 
 Lopez, Alan (2012). Bull Stearman: The Story of the Stearman M-2 Speedmail. Princeton: Mountain Press
 
 

1920s United States mailplanes
M-2
Biplanes
Single-engined tractor aircraft
Aircraft first flown in 1929